The Resurrection Tour is the third headlining concert tour by the American recording artist, Anastacia and first in 5 years. The tour promotes her sixth album, Resurrection''. The tour began October 2014 in Europe  and also visited Australia Her biggest crowd was in Vienna, at the festival Donauinselfest on June 27, 2015; she sang for more than 100,000 people. The tour visited over 20 European countries.

Opening act
Fyre! (Europe—Leg 1)

Setlist
The following setlist was obtained from the January 20, 2015 concert, at the Palladium Köln in Cologne, Germany. It does not represent all concerts during the tour.
"Left Outside Alone"
"Staring at the Sun"
"Sick and Tired"
"Pieces of a Dream"
"Welcome to My Truth"
"Heavy on My Heart"
"Stay"
"Back in Black"
"The Other Side of Crazy"
"Sweet Child o' Mine"
"Instrumental Sequence"
"Lifeline"
"Defeated"
"Broken Wings"
"Evolution"
"Stupid Little Things"
"Paid My Dues"
Encore
"Freak of Nature" (performed by backing vocalist)
"One Day in Your Life"
"I'm Outta Love"

Tour dates

Festivals and other miscellaneous performances

This concert was a part of the "Zermatt Unplugged"
This concert featured the Bremer Philharmoniker
This concert was a part of the "Stadsfesten Skellefteå"
This concert was a part of the "Donauinselfest"
This concert was a part of the "Stars of Sounds Openair Festival"
This concert was a part of the "TW Classic"
This concert was a part of the "Festival Jardins de Pedralbes de Barcelona"
This concert was a part of the "Bospop"
This concert was a part of "Rock um Knuedler"
This concert was a part of the "Brescia Summer Festival"
This concert was a part of "Live at Sunset"
This concert was a part of "Moon and Stars"

This concert was a part of "Luglio suona bene"
This concert was a part of the "Hydrogen Live Festival"
This concert was a part of the "No Borders Music Festival"
This concert was a part of the "GruVillage Festival"
This concert was a part of the "Festival Schloss Kapfenburg"
This concert was a part of the "Ringsted Festival"
This concert was a part of the "Meersburg Open Air"
This concert was a part of the "Rottenburger Sommer Open Air"
This concert was a part of the "Monte-Carlo Sporting Summer Festival"
This concert was a part of "Bakgården"
This concert was a part of the "Starlite Festival"
This concert was a part of the "Zeltfestival Ruhr"

Cancellations and rescheduled shows

Box office score data

References

External links
Anastacia Official Website

Anastacia concert tours
2014 concert tours
2015 concert tours